Tim Corder (born October 8, 1949, in Nampa, Idaho) is an American politician who served as a Republican member of the Idaho Senate from 2004 to 2012. He is married to LaVonne, father to three, and grandfather to three. Corder has been a farmer for 35 years.

Early life and career 
Corder attended Nampa High School and received his diploma in 1967. He is an owner of a trucking company and a farmer. He was in the United States Army from 1968 to 1971, and served in Vietnam during the Vietnam War in 1970.

Corder worked on Sherri Ybarra's campaign in fall of 2014 then went to work to the State Department of Education as her legislative liaison til February 2016.

Elections 
2012

After redistricting, Corder and Senator Bert Brackett were drawn into the same district and faced off in the Republican primary. Corder was defeated in the primary by Brackett earning only 42.6% of the vote.

2010

Corder defeated Marla S. Lawson in the Republican primary earning 58.3% of the vote.

Corder won the general election earning 75.9% of the vote against Henry E. Hibbert.

2008

Corder defeated Clayton E. Cramer in the Republican primary earning 62% of the vote.

Corder won the general election earning 73.3% of the vote against G. Rustyn Casiano.

2006

Corder was unopposed in the Republican primary.

Corder won the general election against Henry E. Hibbert earning 67.91% of the vote.

2004

Corder defeated Marla S. Lawson in the Republican primary earning 53.5% of the vote.

Corder won the general election against James Alexander earning 55% of the vote.

Committees 
He was a member of:
 Agricultural Affairs
 Chairman of Local Government and Taxation
 Transportation Committee
 Mountain Home Highway District Committee
 Childhood Development Task Force
 Health Care Task Force
 Mental Health Subcommittee.

Organizations 
He is a member of:
 Idaho Ag in the Classroom
 Leadership Idaho Agriculture.

References 

1949 births
Living people
Republican Party Idaho state senators
Farmers from Idaho
People from Nampa, Idaho
United States Army personnel of the Vietnam War
United States Army soldiers